Gordon the Garden Gnome is an animated children's television series aimed at getting children interested in gardening. Gordon is a happy garden gnome, whose voice is provided by TV gardening presenter Alan Titchmarsh. The series began in 2005 until 2006.

Synopsis
The series focuses on the title character. Gordon the Garden Gnome tries his best to help the environment and the animals living in his garden, with the help of his gnome friends Percy (Voiced by David Holt), Ian (voiced by Maria Darling), Rosie (also voiced by Maria Darling) and Jerome (voiced by Dan Freedman). There is also a worm named Andrew (also voiced by David Holt), slugs named Lez (also voiced by Dan Freedman) & Dez (voiced by Rob Rackstraw), a squirrel named Daphne, and others.

Production
The series first started development in 2002. The series was originally commissioned by Collingwood O'Hare for CITV.

The series was produced in the United Kingdom by Collingwood O'Hare and in Australia by Southern Star Entertainment. Animated by Suzhou Hong Ying Animation in 2004 in China.

Telecast
The series premiered on CBeebies and ABC Kids in 2005. The series also aired in the USA on Cartoon Network's Tickle-U television programming block. The series has also been shown on KiKa in Germany.

Home media and online streaming
The series' DVDs were released by Paramount Home Entertainment in the late 2000s. Episodes can also be found on Puddle Jumper - Cartoons produced by Southern Star on YouTube (which also has some other shows all created by Southern Star). Tubi has also uploaded the entire show as well.

References

External links
 

2000s Australian animated television series
2005 Australian television series debuts
2006 Australian television series endings
2000s British animated television series
2005 British television series debuts
2006 British television series endings
Australian children's animated television series
British children's animated television shows
BBC children's television shows
Gardening television
English-language television shows
British preschool education television series
Australian preschool education television series
Animated preschool education television series
2000s preschool education television series
Television series by Endemol Australia
CBeebies